The 2012 United States House of Representatives elections in Minnesota were held on Tuesday, November 6, 2012 to elect the eight U.S. representatives from the state of Minnesota. The elections coincided with the elections of other federal and state offices, including a quadrennial presidential election and an election to the U.S. Senate. Primary elections were held on August 14, 2012.

Overview

Redistricting
A redistricting plan was proposed by Republicans in the Minnesota Legislature on May 9, 2011. The plan was passed by the Minnesota House of Representatives on May 13 and the Minnesota Senate on May 18, but was vetoed by Democratic Governor Mark Dayton on May 19.

In February 2012, a state court panel redrew Minnesota's congressional boundaries with the effect of enacting a "least-change" map.

District 1
Democrat Tim Walz, who has represented Minnesota's 1st congressional district since 2007, sought re-election. In redistricting, Murray County, Pipestone County and half of Cottonwood County were moved from the 1st district to the 7th and Wabasha County was moved from the 1st district to the 2nd; while Le Sueur County and most of Rice County were moved from the 2nd district to the 1st. The 1st district was expected to continue to slightly favor Republicans.

Democratic primary

Candidates

Nominee
 Tim Walz, incumbent U.S. Representative

Results

Republican primary

Candidates

Nominee
 Allen Quist, former state representative from legislative district 23B (1983-1989)

Eliminated in primary
 Mike Parry, state senator from senate district 26 since 2010

Declined
 Randy Demmer, former state representative nominee for this seat in 2010,
 Steve Drazkowski, state representative
 Julie Rosen state senator

Results

General election

Endorsements

Results
Walz handily dispatched Quist in the election, garnering 58% of the vote.

District 2
Republican John Kline, who has represented Minnesota's 2nd congressional district since 2003, sought re-election.

In redistricting, Le Sueur County and Rice County were moved from the 2nd district to the 1st and Carver County was moved from the 2nd district to the 3rd and 6th; while West St. Paul and parts of South St. Paul were moved from the 4th district to the 2nd. The 2nd district was made slightly more favorable to Democrats, but continues to favor Republicans.

Republican primary

Candidates

Nominee
 John Kline, incumbent U.S. Representative

Eliminated in primary
 David Gerson

Results

Democratic primary
Patrick Ganey, a member of the Northfield City Council;
Kathleen Gaylord, a member of the Dakota County Commission; former state Representative Mike Obermueller; and Dan Powers, a former small business owner who unsuccessfully sought the DFL nomination in the 2nd district in 2010, sought the Democratic-Farmer-Labor Party nomination to challenge Kline. At the congressional district convention, the party endorsed Mike Obermueller.

Candidates

Nominee
 Mike Obermueller, former State Representative from legislative district 38B (2009-2011)

Withdrawn
 Patrick Ganey, Northfield City Council member
 Kathleen Gaylord, Dakota County Commission member
 Dan Powers, former small business owner candidate for this seat in 2010

Results

General election

Endorsements

Polling

Predictions

Results
Despite a strong challenge from Obermueller, Kline prevailed.

District 3
Republican Erik Paulsen, who has represented Minnesota's 3rd congressional district since 2009 sought re-election.

In redistricting, the 3rd district was expanded to include eastern Carver County, while part of the northeastern Minneapolis–Saint Paul metro area was moved to the 5th. The district was made more favorable to Republicans.

Republican primary

Candidates

Nominee
 Erik Paulsen, incumbent U.S. Representative

Eliminated in primary
 John W. Howard III

Results

Democratic primary
Brian Barnes, an Edina businessman and former Navy Reserve officer and Sharon Sund, a Plymouth scientist and small-business owner sought the Democratic-Farmer-Labor Party nomination to challenge Paulsen. In the third district Democratic convention, Barnes won the party endorsement and Sund backed his candidacy. Sund was subsequently elected Chair of the Hennepin County Democratic-Farmer-Labor Party.

Candidates

Nominee
 Brian Barnes, businessman and former Navy Reserve officer

Withdrawn
 Sharon Sund, Plymouth scientist and small-business owner

Results

General election

Endorsements

Results

Paulsen received 58% of the vote, defeating Barnes who received 42%.

District 4
Democrat Betty McCollum, who has represented Minnesota's 4th congressional district since 2001, sought re-election. In redistricting, the 4th district was made slightly more favorable to Republicans, but continues to strongly favor Democrats.

The home of Republican U.S. Representative Michele Bachmann, who has represented Minnesota's 6th congressional district since 2007, was drawn into the 4th district in redistricting; however Bachmann sought re-election in the 6th district.

McCollum retained her seat, defeating Hernandez.

Democratic primary

Candidates

Nominee
 Betty McCollum, incumbent U.S. Representative

Eliminated in primary
 Diana Longrie, former Mayor of Maplewood (2005-2009)
 Brian Stalboerger

Results

Republican primary

Candidates

Nominee
 Tony Hernandez, businessman and candidate for Senate in 2012

Eliminated in primary
 Ron Seiford, adjunct business instructor at Globe College

Withdrawn
 Dan Flood, retired Navy officer

Declined
 Michele Bachmann, incumbent U.S. Representative for the 6th district

Results

Independence primary

Candidates
 Steve Carlson

Results

General election

Endorsements

Results

District 5
Minnesota's 5th congressional district has been represented by Democrat Keith Ellison since 2007. Gary Boisclair, an anti-abortion activist, and Gregg Iverson unsuccessfully challenged Ellison in the Democratic primary. In redistricting, the 5th district was expanded to include parts of Brooklyn Center, Edina and Minnetonka, and continues to strongly favor Democrats.

Democratic primary

Candidates

Nominee
 Keith Ellison, incumbent U.S. Representative

Eliminated in primary
 Gary Boisclair, anti-abortion activist
 Gregg A. Iverson

Results

Republican primary

Candidates

Nominee
 Chris Fields, retired U.S. Marine

Results

General election

Endorsements

Results
Ellison easily defeated Fields, carrying about 75% of the vote.

District 6
Michele Bachmann, who has represented Minnesota's 6th congressional district since 2007 and unsuccessfully sought the Republican presidential nomination in 2012, sought re-election. 

In redistricting, the 6th district was expanded to include Carver County and was made more favorable to Republicans.

Republican primary
Ron Seiford, an adjunct business instructor at Woodbury's Globe College, and Aubrey Immelman unsuccessfully challenged her in the Republican nomination, though Bachmann won by the lowest margin of any incumbent Republican congressional candidate in 50 years.

Candidates

Nominee
 Michele Bachmann, incumbent U.S. Representative

Eliminated in primary
 Aubrey Immelman, candidate for this seat in 2008
 Stephen Thompson

Withdrawn
 Ron Seiford, adjunct business instructor at Globe College

Results

Democratic primary
Jim Graves, a hotel executive, won the Democratic-Farmer-Labor Party nomination at the party's convention in April 2012.

Candidates

Nominee
 Jim Graves, hotel executive

Withdrawn
Brian McGoldrick, businessman
Anne Nolan, attorney and business consultant 
Mike Starr, substitute teacher

Results

General election

Endorsements

Polling

Predictions

Results
Bachmann narrowly retained the seat, receiving 4,298 more votes than Graves.

District 7
Democrat Collin Peterson, who has represented Minnesota's 7th congressional district since 1991, sought re-election. In redistricting, the 7th district was expanded to include rural counties in southern Minnesota, while cities were moved from the 6th and 8th districts into the 7th.

Democratic primary

Candidates

Nominee
Collin Peterson, incumbent U.S. Representative

Republican primary

Candidates

Nominee
Lee Byberg, business executive and nominee for this seat in 2010 and state senator Gretchen Hoffman,

Withdrawn
Gretchen Hoffman, state senator

General election

Endorsements

Predictions

Results

District 8
Republican Chip Cravaack, who was first elected to represent Minnesota's 8th congressional district in 2010, sought re-election.

In redistricting, the 8th district was not significantly changed and remained competitive.

Republican primary

Candidates

Nominee
 Chip Cravaack, incumbent U.S. Representative

Results

Democratic primary

Candidates

Nominee
 Richard Nolan, former U.S. Representative from Minnesota's 6th congressional district (1975-1981)

Eliminated in primary
 Jeff Anderson, former Duluth City Councilor (2007-2011)
 Tarryl Clark, former State Senator from senate district 15 (2006-2011) and nominee for the 6th district in 2010

Withdrawn
Daniel Fanning, former deputy state director for Senator Al Franken

Declined
Tom Bakk, State senate minority leader 
Carly Melin, State representative
Don Ness,Mayor of Duluth 
Roger Reinert, state senator 
Tom Rukavina, state representative 
Tony Sertich, former state house majority leader
Yvonne Prettner Solon, incumbent Lieutenant Governor

Campaign
Nolan was victorious in a February 2012 caucus, receiving 1,537 votes to Anderson's 1,008 and Clark's 408. 269 uncommitted votes were cast.

Delegates to a convention held in May 2012 could endorse one candidate, but candidates who did not receive the party's endorsement were nonetheless able to run in the August 2012 primary.

Endorsements

Results

General election

Endorsements

Polling

Predictions

Results
Nolan triumphed over Cravaack, receiving about 55% of the vote.

References

External links
Elections & Voting from the Minnesota Secretary of State
Official candidate list
2012 elections results
2012 Candidate filings
United States House of Representatives elections in Minnesota, 2012 at Ballotpedia
Minnesota U.S. House from OurCampaigns.com
Campaign contributions for Minnesota congressional races from OpenSecrets
Outside spending at the Sunlight Foundation
Campaign 2012 at Minnesota Public Radio News

Minnesota
2012
United States House of Representatives